The Utilikilts Company is an American kilt company that was founded by Steven Villegas in April 2000. Villegas created his first kilt in the late '90s as an alternative to pants meant to offer freedom of movement, while working on his motorcycle. Created from an old pair of military pants, Villegas was so fond of his creation he wore it quite often around town.  He was approached by his first customer, "a bouncer that you wouldn't want to mess with", at a local bar.

That first encounter encouraged him to produce more kilts, and sell them at the Pike Place Market and Fremont Street Market, in Seattle; where he met co-founder, Megan Haas.  Villegas soon formed the Utilikilts Company, establishing both brick-and-mortar and web based storefront for the product. Haas left the company in 2005.

Commercial success

Utilikilt's commercial success is primarily from word of mouth, as the company does not pay for product placement or commercial endorsement and eschews professional models in favor of photos of actual customers. Despite this low-key approach, sales grew from 750 kilts the first year to over 11,000 three years later.  The company received a big boost in recognition after Richard Hatch donned a Utilikilt on-screen in Survivor: All-Stars.

The Utilikilt was also used as part of the costume for the O.Z. rebels in the Sci-Fi Channel miniseries Tin Man (2007)

The character Lafayette wears a Utilikilt in the premiere episode of HBO series True Blood.

A Utilikilt is the featured prop promoting gender equality in Linda Biggs' artwork, "One of the Boys."

References

Further reading

External links

Clothing companies of the United States
Skirts
Culture of Seattle
Companies based in Seattle
American companies established in 2000
Clothing companies established in 2000
2000 establishments in Washington (state)
Kilts For Men